Rob Rogers (born May 23, 1959) is an editorial cartoonist. His cartoons appeared in The Pittsburgh Press from 1984 to 1993, and the Pittsburgh Post-Gazette from 1993 to 2018. In 1999 and 2019, he was a finalist for the Pulitzer Prize for Editorial Cartooning.

He was fired from the Pittsburgh Post-Gazette on June 14, 2018 for his cartoons that were critical of President Donald Trump.

His cartoons are still syndicated by GoComics.

Works 
 No Cartoon Left Behind!: The Best of Rob Rogers., Pittsburgh, PA : Carnegie Mellon University Press, 2009. , 
 Mayoral Ink: Cartooning Pittsburgh's Mayors. Pittsburgh, PA : The Author, 2015. , 
 Enemy of the People: A Cartoonist's Journey, San Diego, CA : IDW, Idea & Design Works, 2019. ,

References

External links 
 
 Rob Rogers comics at GoComics

Living people
American editorial cartoonists
1959 births
Artists from Pittsburgh
Presidents of the Association of American Editorial Cartoonists